Three Russian Girls (also known as She Who Dares) is a 1943 American World War II pro-Soviet propaganda film produced by R-F Productions and distributed by United Artists. It is a remake of the Soviet film The Girl from Leningrad (1941). It was nominated for an Oscar in 1945 for best musical score. It stars Anna Sten.

Plot
The film depicts the life of a group of volunteer nurses for the Red Cross in 1941. Anna Sten portrays a Russian nurse, Natasha, who is one of the volunteers taking care of the Allied soldiers near Stalingrad. As part of her job, she takes care of a newly arrived American flier John Hill, interpreted by Kent Smith. Even though Natasha is betrothed to Sergei Korovin, she starts to fall in love with the American under her care.

When the enemy's forces attack the hospital, the patients and the crew are ordered to evacuate the battleground. Given that there are not enough vehicles, Natasha, John, and other wounded men stay behind waiting to be rescued.

Cast
Anna Sten as Natasha
Kent Smith as John Hill
Mimi Forsythe as Tamara
Alexander Granach as Major Braginski
Kathy Frye as Chijik
Kane Richmond as Sergei
Manart Kippen as Doctor
Jack Gardner as Misha
Marcia Lenack as Shoora
Mary Herriot as Zina

Production 
In September 1942, Metro-Goldwyn-Mayer tried to purchase the film rights to The Girl from Leningrad from Eugene Frenke and Gregor Rabinovich. The studio intended to hire Gregory Ratoff as director and Michèle Morgan and Greta Garbo as the stars. Rabinovich ultimately decided to produce the film independently. He initially hired E. Stork and Igor Vushenko as screenwriters. Maria Manton, Akim Tamiroff, Leonid Kinskey, Tamara Shayne, E. Grusskin, Melva Doney and Diane Duval were announced as initial cast members of the film but were replaced. Rabinovich wanted to cast Luise Rainer as Natasha before hiring Anna Sten. Oona O'Neill and Leo Bulgakov were cast as Tamara and Misha.

References

External links

1943 films
American pro-Soviet propaganda films
American black-and-white films
Films directed by Fedor Ozep
Eastern Front of World War II films
Films about the Soviet Union in the Stalin era
American war comedy films
1940s war comedy films
1943 comedy films
1940s American films
1940s English-language films